The Magic Link was a Personal Intelligent Communicator marketed by Sony from 1994, based on General Magic's Magic Cap operating system. The Magic Link PIC-1000 was brought to market by Jerry Fiala Sr at Sony.  The "Link" part of the name refers to the device's ability to send and receive data over a modem.

A competing product to the Magic Link was the Motorola Envoy. In 1995, the Magic Link won the PC World World Class Award. Magic Link PIC-2000 was released in 1996.

Applications

 Messages
 Address Book
 Clock and Calendar
 Notebook
 Spreadsheet
 Datebook
 Phone
 Fax machine (Kobes Japan model only)
 Pocket Quicken
 Sony AV Remote Commander
 Calculator
 AT&T PersonaLink Services
 America Online mail client

Documentary film
The device features prominently in the documentary film General Magic about the epic rise and fall of General Magic.

References

Personal digital assistants
Sony hardware